This article is about the particular significance of the year 1905 to Wales and its people.

Incumbents

Archdruid of the National Eisteddfod of Wales – Hwfa Môn

Lord Lieutenant of Anglesey – Sir Richard Henry Williams-Bulkeley, 12th Baronet  
Lord Lieutenant of Brecknockshire – Joseph Bailey, 1st Baron Glanusk (until 19 December); Joseph Bailey, 2nd Baron Glanusk (from 19 December)
Lord Lieutenant of Caernarvonshire – John Ernest Greaves
Lord Lieutenant of Cardiganshire – Herbert Davies-Evans
Lord Lieutenant of Carmarthenshire – Sir James Williams-Drummond, 4th Baronet
Lord Lieutenant of Denbighshire – William Cornwallis-West    
Lord Lieutenant of Flintshire – Hugh Robert Hughes 
Lord Lieutenant of Glamorgan – Robert Windsor-Clive, 1st Earl of Plymouth
Lord Lieutenant of Merionethshire – W. R. M. Wynne 
Lord Lieutenant of Monmouthshire – Godfrey Morgan, 1st Viscount Tredegar
Lord Lieutenant of Montgomeryshire – Sir Herbert Williams-Wynn, 7th Baronet 
Lord Lieutenant of Pembrokeshire – Frederick Campbell, 3rd Earl Cawdor
Lord Lieutenant of Radnorshire – Powlett Milbank

Bishop of Bangor – Watkin Williams 
Bishop of Llandaff – Richard Lewis (until 24 January); Joshua Pritchard Hughes (from 1 June)
Bishop of St Asaph – A. G. Edwards (later Archbishop of Wales) 
Bishop of St Davids – John Owen

Events
31 January – 1904–1905 Welsh Revival: Rev Peter Price writes to the Western Mail, criticising the "so-called" revival led by Evan Roberts.
10 March – 33 men are killed in a mining accident at Cambrian Colliery, Clydach Vale, Rhondda.
29 March – Evan Roberts embarks on his first and only mission outside Wales, spending a three-week period in Liverpool.
27 May – Thomas Price becomes Premier of South Australia.
30 June – Opening of the Prichard Jones Institute at Newborough, Anglesey.
11 July – National Colliery disaster at Wattstown in the Rhondda: an underground explosion kills 120 men, with just one survivor.
28 August – The Dyserth branch line is opened to passengers.
21 October - The centenary of the death of Horatio Nelson is commemorated in a ceremony at The Kymin.  Participants include Lady Llangattock.
28 October - Edward VII grants city status to Cardiff.
10 December – David Lloyd George joins the new Liberal Cabinet of Sir Henry Campbell-Bannerman as President of the Board of Trade.
18 December – The earldom of Plymouth is revived in favour of Robert George Windsor-Clive, 14th Baron Windsor, who also becomes Viscount Windsor of St. Fagan's.
28 December – Godfrey Morgan is created Viscount Tredegar.
Sir John Williams purchases the Peniarth manuscripts at the instigation of John Gwenogvryn Evans.

Arts and literature
Edward Morgan Humphreys joins the staff of Y Genedl Gymreig.

Awards
National Eisteddfod of Wales – held in Mountain Ash
Chair – No winner
Crown – Thomas Mathonwy Davies

New books

English language
David Ffrangcon Davies – The Singing of the Future
W. H. Davies – The Soul's Destroyer
Allen Raine - Hearts of Wales
Owen Rhoscomyl – Flame-Bearers of Welsh History

Welsh language
Gwaith Ann Griffiths (ed. Owen Morgan Edwards)
John Jones (Myrddin Fardd) – Cynfeirdd Lleyn
Gwyneth Vaughan - O Gorlannau'r Defaid
John Watson – Yr Hen Ddoctor

Film
The Life of Charles Peace made by Ifan ab Owen Edwards

Music
David John de Lloyd is the first music graduate of University of Wales, Aberystwyth.
John Hughes - "Cwm Rhondda" (hymn tune, first version, as "Rhondda")
William Penfro Rowlands – "Blaenwern" (hymn tune)

Sport
Bowls – The International Bowling Board is formed in Cardiff.
Rugby union 
11 March – Wales win the Home Nations Championship and take the Triple Crown.
16 December – Wales defeat the first touring New Zealand team at Cardiff Arms Park.

Births
6 January – Idris Davies, poet (died 1953)
10 February – Rachel Thomas, actress (died 1995)
28 February – Glyn Jones, writer (died 1995)
1 March – Doris Hare, actress (died 2000) 
18 April – Alun Oldfield-Davies, controller of BBC Wales (died 1988)
18 May – Thomas Jones Pierce, historian (died 1964)
28 June – Albert Clifford Williams, politician (died 1987)
11 July – Jack Bassett, Wales international rugby union player (died 1989)
2 August – Myrna Loy, actress of Welsh descent (died 1993)
13 August – Gareth Jones, journalist and advisor to David Lloyd George (died 1935)
28 August – Cyril Walters, cricketer (died 1992)
31 October – W. F. Grimes, archaeologist (died 1988)
26 November – Emlyn Williams, dramatist and actor (died 1987) 
10 December – John Edward Jones, Plaid Cymru leader (died 1970)
18 December – Stanley Cornwell Lewis, artist (died 2009)
22 December – Gwyn Richards, dual-code rugby player (died 1985)
29 December – Billy Williams, dual-code international rugby player (died 1973)

Deaths
24 January – Richard Lewis, Bishop of Llandaff, 83
7 March – Robert Isaac Jones, pharmacist, writer and printer
14 March – Henry Paget, 5th Marquess of Anglesey, eccentric (died in Monte Carlo), 29
25 April – David Watkin Jones, poet, 73 
29 May – Robert Franklin John, Welsh-born farmer and political figure in British Columbia, 54
August/September – Peter Rees Jones, entrepreneur, 62
14 October – John Thomas, photographer, 67
15 October – Thomas Howells (Hywel Cynon), poet and musician, 66
19 October – Anne Ceridwen Rees, practising physician in the US, 31
23 October – William Phillips, botanist, 83
28 October – Barry Girling, Wales international rugby union player
10 November – Rowland Williams (Hwfa Môn), poet and archdruid, 82
19 November – Watkin Hezekiah Williams (Watcyn Wyn), schoolmaster and poet, 61
25 November – William Cadwaladr Davies, educationist, 56
8 December – Edward Davies, US-born minister, publisher of Y Cenhadwr, 78
9 December – Arthur Humphreys-Owen, barrister, landowner and politician, 69
14 December – Nathaniel Jones, minister and poet, 73
17 December – Robert Jones Derfel, poet and dramatist, 81

References